Fargo South High School, more commonly known as Fargo South , South High, or South is a public high school located in Fargo, North Dakota. The campus serves about 1,000 students in grades 9-12. The school is a part of the Fargo Public Schools system. The official school colors are brown and gold and the athletic teams are known as the Bruins.

History
Fargo South High School was built when the previous school, Fargo Central High School, burned down in 1966. Students from Central High finished the ‘66 school year at Fargo North High School and spent the 1966-67 school year at North High during the construction of a new school. The new facility in South Fargo became South High and the “Bruins” christened their new high school 
with the beginning of the ‘67-68 school year.

In 1999, the school completed a massive expansion and renovation project. Until 2011, Fargo South High School served the entire Fargo Public School district south of Main Avenue and once had a student population of over 2,000. Freshmen were served by Discovery Junior High School from 1994-2006 and then housed in the former Agassiz Middle School building (termed "South Campus II") from 2006 - 2011. Beginning with the 2011–2012 school year, the school population split with the new Fargo Davies High School.

Students 
The student-body in South High is very diverse with many students coming in from Nepal, Vietnam, and Several African countries.

Athletics
Fargo South is a part of the North Dakota High School Activities Association and has won the following championships:

State Class 'A' Boys’ Basketball: 1986, 1989, 2005
State Class 'A' Girls’ Basketball: 1985, 1992, 1994
State Class 'A' Boys' Cross Country:1985, 1999, 2002, 2003
State Class 'A' Boys’ Track and Field: 1986, 1987, 1988, 1995, 1996, 2000, 2003, 2013
State Class 'A' Girls’ Track and Field: 1982, 2001, 2003, 2004, 2007
State Class 'A' Baseball: 1996, 1998, 2011
State Class 'A' Football: 1978, 1982, 1986, 1987, 1989, 1990, 1992, 1996
State Class 'AAA' Football: 2004, 2006, 2007, 2010, 2013
State Class 'A' Boys' Hockey: 1994, 1999, 2006
State Class 'A' Cheerleading: 2001, 2004, 2005, 2006, 2008
State Class 'A' Boys' Tennis: 2015, 2017

Clubs and activities
Clubs and activities include AFROTC, Art Club, Bike Club, Chess Club, DECA, Debate, Environmental Club, FBLA, French Club, Gaming Club, Geocaching Club, German Club, FCCLA, History Club, Intramurals, Improv Club, International Club, Journalism, 
Junior Classical League, Key Club, Music (Bands, Choirs, and Orchestra – Various), National Honor Society, Performing Arts, Science Olympiad, Ski/Snowboard Club, Spanish Club, Speech, Congressional Debate, Debate, Student Council, Usher Corps, VICA (SkillsUSA), and Yearbook.

Notable alumni
Chris Coste, catcher, Philadelphia Phillies
Dan Fabian, Minnesota State Representative 1A (2011–2021)
Drew Wrigley, Lieutenant Governor of North Dakota, U.S. Attorney for the District of North Dakota
Laura Roesler, professional runner, College Athlete 
Reina del Cid, musician
CariDee English, model
Brian C. Kesselring, 38th Blue Angels Flight Leader/Commanding Officer.
Tom Hoge, Professional Golfer

References

External links

 Fargo South High School

Public high schools in North Dakota
Education in Fargo–Moorhead
North Dakota High School Activities Association (Class A)
North Dakota High School Activities Association (Class AAA Football)
Schools in Cass County, North Dakota
Buildings and structures in Fargo, North Dakota